Transmembrane protein 160 is a protein that in humans is encoded by the TMEM160 gene.

References

Further reading